Andrey Potapkin (born 12 July 1996) is a Russian rower. He competed in the 2020 Summer Olympics.

References

1996 births
Living people
Rowers from Moscow
Rowers at the 2020 Summer Olympics
Russian male rowers
Olympic rowers of Russia